Mercs for Money is a fictional superhero mercenary team appearing in American comic books published by Marvel Comics.

Publication history
Mercs for Money first appeared in Deadpool #1 (Dec. 2015) and were created by Gerry Duggan. Eight months after the events of the Secret Wars storyline as seen during the All-New, All-Different Marvel event, Deadpool establishes a new team of Heroes for Hire. The roster consists of Solo, Madcap, Masacre, Slapstick, Foolkiller, Terror and Stingray. Matt Murdock and Luke Cage are shown planning legal action against Deadpool. After the lawsuit goes through, Deadpool renames his Heroes for Hire group into Deadpool's "Mercs for Money."

Fictional team biography

Deadpool's Mercs for Money
This group of mercenaries gathered together by Deadpool was originally named Heroes for Hire. Deadpool was inspired to create a franchise around his identity after Solo impersonated him and piggybacked on the merc's success to take jobs at Deadpool's pay rate. Solo's impersonation helped Deadpool become more popular, thus benefiting both mercs.

After turning Solo into his first employee, Deadpool began to recruit other vigilantes who would initially wear costumes identical to his like Foolkiller, Madcap, Masacre, Slapstick, Stingray and Terror. Deadpool's team was legally forced to change their name after receiving a cease an desist letter from Luke Cage and Matt Murdock. They chose "Mercs for Money" as the replacement name. What the other members don't know is that Stingray is secretly working for Captain America to keep him updated on the more deranged members of the Mercs for Money. Around this time, the Mercs for Money began to use color-coded costumes to distinguish each other from an independent Deadpool impersonator who was ruining the real one's reputation. It turned out that the evil Deadpool impersonator was Mercs for Money member Madcap. Once they got rid of Madcap, the Mercs for Money began using their own personal uniforms.

During the "Civil War II" storyline, the members of the Mercs for Money have been displeased when expecting Deadpool to give them their paychecks. While trying to start their own business, the Mercs for Money members discover that they were being skimmed by Deadpool. Upon retrieving a safety deposit from Ho-Ho-Kus, New Jersey, and setting their contracts on fire, the Mercs for Money and Deadpool went their separate ways.

Domino's Mercs for Money
A second incarnation of Mercs for Money appears in the 2016 "Marvel NOW!" After Deadpool's failed attempt at saving Negasonic Teenage Warhead (who he and the Mercs for Money had previously obtained for Umbral Dynamics), Domino shows up to where Deadpool is and reveals to him that she has assembled a new Mercs for Money team consisting of herself, Gorilla-Man, Machine Man, and a reenlisted Masacre. Domino told Deadpool that they showed up to help him and states that she is the one calling the shots for the Mercs for Money. Following the defeat of the Presence, Negasonic Teenage Warhead and Hit-Monkey join the Mercs for Money.

Membership

Members of Deadpool's Mercs for Money
 Deadpool - Leader
 Foolkiller (Gregory P. Salinger)
 Madcap
 Masacre
 Scott Adsit
 Solo
 Slapstick
 Stingray - He was an undercover operative working for Captain America.
 Terror

Members of Domino's Mercs for Money
 Domino - Leader
 Deadpool
 Gorilla-Man (Kenneth Hale)
 Hit-Monkey
 Machine Man
 Masacre
 Negasonic Teenage Warhead

Collected Editions

References

External links
 Mercs for Money at Marvel Wiki
 Mercs for Money at Comic Vine

Marvel Comics titles
Fictional mercenaries in comics
2015 comics debuts
Marvel Comics superhero teams
X-Men supporting characters